is a 1956 black-and-white Japanese film directed by Kenji Mizoguchi. It is the personal tales of several Japanese women of different backgrounds who work together in a brothel. It was Mizoguchi's last film.

The film is based on the novel Susaki no Onna by Yoshiko Shibaki. In July 2018, it was selected to be screened in the Venice Classics section at the 75th Venice International Film Festival.

Plot
Street of Shame revolves around the lives of 5 female prostitutes working at Dreamland, a licensed brothel owned by the Tayas in a red-light district near the Sensōji Temple in Tokyo's Yoshiwara district, while the Diet reconsiders a ban on prostitution.
1) Yasumi is a young woman trying to bail her father out of jail for corruption and Dreamland's top owner. Her long-term client, Mr. Aoki, a married man and a modest businessman, agrees to pay off all of her debts in the belief that she will elope with him, going so far as to embezzle money. When Aoki confronts Yasumi and discovers that she had deceived him into thinking she would marry him, his disillusionment leads to a tussle where he nearly kills her.
2) Mickey is a vivacious young woman with Western tendencies who spends money without care. When her father arrives from Kobe with news of her mother's death and attempts to persuade her to quit her job for the sake of the entire family, she castigates him for his hedonism when her mother was alive and throws him out.
3) Hanae is a woman struggling to provide for her husband (who has suicidal tendencies) and infant. Ultimately, they are evicted by their landlord.
4) Yorie is an elderly woman with a man she wants to marry but cannot because she owes the Tayas a significant amount of money. When the courts decide that the debts Yorie owes to the Tayas are null and void, she leaves Dreamland to marry the man, but soon returns after being deceived because the man only wanted to exploit her for cheap labor.
5) Yumeko is an elderly widow trying to raise her son, who is currently working in Tokyo, but avoids meeting him out of embarrassment. When they meet, her son decries her as a "dirty whore" and disowns her. On the same night that Yasumi is attacked, Yumeko goes insane and is taken away. Yasumi recovers and buys the fabric and futon business next door to the brothel, which becomes her first customer.
Ultimately, the anti-prostitution bill fails to pass. Some time later, the brothel's young maid, Shizuko, debuts. The film ends with Shizuko timidly beckoning men to enter the brothel as she faces a life of prostitution.

Cast

The production designer was Hiroshi Mizutani.

Legacy
Red Light District: Gonna Get Out (1974) directed by Tatsumi Kumashiro is a remake of this film.

References

External links
 
 
 The Criterion Collection: Street of Shame

1956 films
1956 drama films
Japanese drama films
Japanese black-and-white films
1950s Japanese-language films
Films about prostitution in Japan
Films set in Tokyo
Films directed by Kenji Mizoguchi
Films produced by Masaichi Nagata
Daiei Film films
1950s Japanese films